No One Can Do It Better is the debut studio album by The D.O.C., released on August 1, 1989, by Ruthless Records and Atlantic Records. It reached no.1 on the US Top R&B/Hip-Hop Albums chart for two weeks, while peaking in the Top 20 on the Billboard 200 chart. The album was certified Gold by the RIAA three months after it was released, and Platinum on April 21, 1994. This was the only solo album The D.O.C. was able to record before a car accident resulted in crushing his larynx and permanently changing his voice. In recent years, however, he has been undergoing vocal surgery. He would not release another album until 7 years later, with Helter Skelter (1996), also released by Warner Music Group, but on Giant Records rather than Atlantic. The Formula has been seen as the song that invented G-funk.

Album information
Idolizing East Coast acts such as Run-D.M.C. and Public Enemy, The D.O.C. always showed more of a lyrical style, not talking about guns, drugs and violence. The album received a Parental Advisory sticker because of the final track on the album ("The Grand Finalé"). Most of the songs were influenced and sampled from funk artists such as Marvin Gaye, Parliament, and Funkadelic, but one track in particular was influenced by other genres, "Beautiful But Deadly," a rock-hip hop track, influenced by Run-D.M.C. with a heavy guitar riff throughout the song (it borrows from Funkadelic's Cosmic Slop).

All five then-current members of N.W.A contributed to this album. Beats were produced by Dr. Dre, with Eazy-E being the executive producer. Dre, Ice Cube, MC Ren and Eazy all provide vocals for "The Grand Finalé", while Ren also provides vocals for "Comm. 2". DJ Yella performs on "Comm. Blues," "Comm. 2," and "The Grand Finalé" as a drummer.

No One Can Do It Better also features additional vocals by Krazy Dee (who also co-wrote the N.W.A song "Panic Zone" from N.W.A. and the Posse), J. J. Fad, Yomo & Maulkie and Michel'le, who were all part of Ruthless as well. Andre "L.A. Dre" Bolton and Stan "The Guitar Man" Jones, who play keyboards and guitar on some of the tracks respectively, also worked for the label.

Critical reception

From contemporary reviews, music critic Robert Christgau of The Village Voice said that the first three songs have music that is funky, multi-dimensional, and engaging, but the rest of the album's funk diminishes and leaves listeners having to focus on D.O.C.'s inferior lyrics. Daniel Weizmann of LA Weekly called The D.O.C. a good rapper whose rhymes "spring out like menacing jacks in the box just when you think he's about tread over the same old rap cliches." Weizmann noted that No One Can Do It Better has "bravado and loathing and deep sexual phobias (like almost all other rap records today)" while it still had "grace and elocution and literary richness." Weizmann also praised Dr. Dre, declaring him "a sound-collage artist to a degree no other producer in rap even touches" and that "If the rappers in front of Dre weren't so often obscene, and if the act of sampling and mixing were taken with the slightest bit of seriousness as an art, I'm positive Dre would be considered the Phil Spector of his generation." J.D. Considine wrote in The Baltimore Sun praised the album, stating that "what really gives this album an edge is the fact that he never pulls his punches, infusing each track with an impressive ferocity".

In a retrospective review, AllMusic stated, "It's a shame that the D.O.C. never got the chance for a proper follow-up, but in No One Can Do It Better, he at least has one undeniable masterpiece."

Track listing

Notes
The "Real Gone" edition is basically the same master, with the bass amped, and treble lowered. "Comm. Blues" is also edited at the intro ("8 ball piss").

Cut tracks
 "Bridgette" – cut from the album because of sexual content, released in 1996 as part of the Dr. Dre compilation First Round Knock Out

Singles

Charts

Year-end charts

Certifications

See also
List of number-one R&B albums of 1989 (U.S.)

References

Ruthless Records albums
1989 debut albums
Albums produced by Dr. Dre
The D.O.C. albums
Hip hop albums by American artists
Atlantic Records albums